Neil Paterson (born April 21, 1964) is a Canadian former competitive figure skater. He is the 1980 Karl Schäfer Memorial bronze medalist, 1981 Prague Skate silver medalist, and a two-time Canadian national silver medalist. His best World Championship result was 10th in 1985. He was selected to represent Canada at the 1988 Winter Olympics and finished 16th.

Competitive highlights

References

 
 

1964 births
Living people
Canadian male single skaters
Olympic figure skaters of Canada
Figure skaters at the 1988 Winter Olympics
Sportspeople from Ottawa
20th-century Canadian people
21st-century Canadian people